Piptothrix is a genus of Mesoamerican plants in the tribe Eupatorieae within the family Asteraceae.

 Species
 Piptothrix areolaris (DC.) R.M.King & H.Rob. - from Chihuahua to El Salvador
 Piptothrix jaliscensis B.L.Rob. - Jalisco
 Piptothrix palmeri A.Gray - Chihuahua 
 Piptothrix pubens A.Gray  - Jalisco
 Piptothrix sinaloae S.F.Blake - Sinaloa
 formerly included
see Ageratina Jaliscoa 
 Piptothrix aegiroides B.L.Rob. & Greenm. - Jaliscoa goldmanii (B.L.Rob.) R.M.King & H.Rob.
 Piptothrix arizonica A.Nelson - Ageratina paupercula (A.Gray) R.M.King & H.Rob.
 Piptothrix goldmanii B.L.Rob. - Jaliscoa goldmanii (B.L.Rob.) R.M.King & H.Rob.
 Piptothrix paleacea Cronquist - Jaliscoa paleacea (Cronquist) R.M.King & H.Rob.

References

Eupatorieae
Asteraceae genera
Flora of North America